Guido De Santi (16 May 1923 – 30 October 1998) was an Italian racing cyclist. He won the 1951 Deutschland Tour. He also rode in the 1948 and 1949 Tour de France.

References

External links 

1923 births
1998 deaths
Italian male cyclists
Sportspeople from Trieste
Cyclists from Friuli Venezia Giulia